SpellForce: The Order of Dawn is a 2003 real-time strategy and role-playing video game, developed by Phenomic Game Development and published by Encore, Inc. The first instalment in the SpellForce series, the game takes place within a high-fantasy world in the years following a devastating cataclysmic event that has shattered the lands into several islands. The story itself focuses on an immortal slave who is granted their freedom in order to investigate growing troubles amongst some of these islands, which soon brings war to their inhabitants. The game combines elements of role-playing such as taking on quests, equipping characters and improving them when levelling up, alongside real-time strategy elements focused on gathering resources to construct bases and units. In addition to the game's story campaign, players can also engage in skirmish battles, and multiplayer matches.

The game was released in Europe on November 11, 2003, and in North America on February 11, 2004. The Order of Dawn received favorable reviews, with two expansions later released for it by JoWooD Productions: SpellForce: The Breath of Winter in June 2004, and SpellForce: Shadow of the Phoenix in November that same year. Both the main game and the expansions were later re-released as a package titled SpellForce Platinum Edition in November 2005. The success of the game led to it spawning two sequels: SpellForce 2: Shadow Wars on August 21, 2006, and SpellForce 3 on December 7, 2017.

Gameplay 
SpellForce is both a real-time strategy and role-playing video game played from the third-person perspective. In the game, players take on the role of a character that they create (an avatar) who explore a variety of maps, conducting quests and killing monsters, and earning experience to level up, improve skills, and unlock the ability to wield new equipment. Alongside their character, players can summon immortal warriors (deemed as "Runewarriors" in the game) who act like additional party members to help in exploration of the game world and combat, as well as armies of military units - done through gathering resources, building structures, and then recruiting units that are unlocked as a result - to help with large-scale battles.

As with traditional role-playing games, player-created characters can be assigned to one of three classes - fighter, archer or magician - with different stat points and allocated skills when being created. By increasing certain skills, players can equip their character to using new types of weapons and spells for combat. However, death does not permanently end the game  if a player has activated a monument called a "bindstone" on a map, then their character will re-spawn at if should they die in battle. In battles, players have access to a system that allows them to activate combat skills and spells depending on what is selected - if an enemy is selected, players can dictate which characters attack it, and what skills/spells are used on it. Allies that join the character level up as well, but usually remain a few levels behind the lead character; in addition, they may only be recruited by acquiring a runestone they are bound to and equipping it, with the player able to switch to other allies when needed. The game's real-time strategy elements occur when the player must use armies to accomplish objectives. Commanding the armies of the six-controllable races  humans, dwarves, elves, orcs, trolls and dark elves  requires owning a rune for their base's workers, as well as controlling that race's monument on a map. Base construction and unit recruiting requires gathering resources with worker units, as well as making upgrades to access new buildings and stronger units.

The game features an extensive campaign mode that covers a series of interlinked game maps, which become accessible as players make progress in the story. During the campaign, players can engage in two types of quests: Main Quests, which progress the story, provide access to new units and structures, provide new runes for use, and unlock new maps to explore; and Side Quests, which provide optional means of earning experience and other rewards. Quests are begun by finding an NPC in a game-map, and may sometimes require visiting another game map to complete is objectives. Alongside this, the players can also engage in Freeplay mode - which allows players to freely do what they want without quests on any map - as well as compete in multiplayer battles with other players.

Plot

Setting 
SpellForce: The Order of Dawn takes place on the high-fantasy world of Eo, inhabited by several races including humans, elves, dwarves and orcs, which originally consisted of several continents, islands and oceans. 80 years before the story begins, a group of 13 powerful mages known as The Circle were engaged in a war due to the lust for power, which was worsened when they came across a powerful ritual  known as the Convocation, the ritual would allow them to acquire the powers of the elementals that the god Aonir had bound together in order to form Eo, during a celestial event that blocked Aonir's power. Eventually one of the Circle managed to invoke the Convocation, only to discover that the elementals could not be controlled by them, causing Eo to be shattered into a series of islands, each held together by obelisks that channelled Aonir's power while isolated from each other by an elemental sea, which prevents travel by ship.

The single-player campaign takes place amongst a group of these islands that formed the northern half of the continent of Fiara, which maintain links with each other thanks to a portal network established by the mage Rohen Tahir, a supposed survivor of the Circle as most of its members were killed during Eo's shattering. The story focuses on the plight of a Runewarrior  one of several immortal slaves created by the Circle from the souls of warriors and mages to lead their armies  who Rohen releases in order to investigate a troubling set of events.

Synopsis
During a heated battle between armies of humans and orcs, Circle mage Rohen Tahir attempts to stop another member of the Circle from invoking the ritual of Convocation, but fails in doing so, resulting in Eo being shattered by the elementals bound beneath its surface. 80 years later, Rohen, having spent the years creating a portal network to keep the remaining land connected in the wake of the Convocation, receives a powerful runestone from a former Circle servant. Using it to summon forth a powerful Runewarrior, he frees them from their slavery and before instructing them to travel to the town of Greyfell and find further instructions on what to do. Shortly after Rohen leaves to investigate reports of creatures made of black steel, the Runewarrior is led into an ambush by a mage referred to as "The Dark One". Learning that Rohen is walking into a trap and that several islands are about to be invaded, the Runewarrior escapes their trap and begins a quest to find and save Rohen.

In Greyfell, the Runewarrior learns that much of the northern islands have been overrun by mercenaries known as The Black Fist, who have allied with local orc tribes. Gaining the support of an outfit known as The Order of Dawn, the Runewarrior begins work on clearing a path to Rohen, dealing with the orcs and mercenaries. After catching up to Rohen, who is exploring the island of Frostland Marches for a casket, they quickly inform him about the Dark One. Surprised by this, Rohen gives them a book about the Convocation and informs them to find a powerful item known to the mage Hokan, which is the only thing that can stop the Dark One. Shortly after this, Rohen finds and opens the casket he sought out, but finds it empty. At that moment, the Dark One arrives and kills Rohen, before telling the Runewarrior to inform the Order that an age of war is coming, before blocking the way beyond the island with an army of black steel creatures called the Iron Ones.

Returning to the Order, the Runewarrior learns that Hokan was not only a member of the Circle, but also a necromancer who returned from his death as a ghost that commands undead armies. Discovering he is commanding his armies to find an artifact, the Runewarrior retrieves it and brings it to Hokan. In exchange for it, Hokan reveals that the Iron Ones were his own creation designed to deal with the armies of demons his rival commanded, and that the only thing that can stop a member of the Circle is an artifact called the Phoenix Stone. With this knowledge, the Runewarrior retrieves the stone, but is unable to stop the Order launching an attack on the barricade of the Iron Ones, successfully breaching it at the cost of their own men. Although they continue their pursuit of the Dark One, a trap causes them to lose both the Phoenix Stone and the Book of Convocation.

Despite this, the Runewarrior eventually tracks down and confronts the Dark One at their fortress, only to discover that the mage is actually a younger version of Rohen. They quickly learn that Rohen had tried to invoke the Convocation 80 years ago, but after it failed, they travelled into the future to find what they needed in order to go back and attempt the Convocation again in order to get it right. Thanking the Runewarrior, Rohen opens a time-gate and travels back into the past, years before the Convocation was invoked. However, the ending cutscenes reveals how the younger Rohen soon changed, after realizing how foolish his quest for power was and the destruction he had caused, effectively being caught in a time-loop in which he would try to stop his younger self but fail, and then be killed by him, allowing events to repeat themselves while effectively ending the Circle's madness for good.

Reception

In the German market, SpellForce sold above 100,000 units by early 2004.

Andrew Park from GameSpot said in his review of the game: ‘SpellForce's unique combination of role-playing and strategy elements makes it worth a look for fans of either kind of game.’ However he said about the voice-over ‘some of it is decent, though the rest is fairly bad.’ The game scores a 7.4 based on 24 reviews by GameSpot for Metacritic. GameSpot later named it the best computer game of February 2004.

In the review of Dan Adams of IGN the gameplay and graphics of the game were praised. However he said about the voice acting that it was some of the worst he had heard in a while. He gave the game an overall score of 8.2 out of 10.

Alex Tsotsos from GameSpy said about the game that as a single-player game, SpellForce shines. However he said the game lacked ‘the plotline choices that mark the best RPGs.’ He also criticized the enemy AI and gave the game a score of 3 out of 5 stars.

Awards 
SpellForce and its expansion packs have been awarded with several awards in the German Developer Awards:

Expansions

Breath of Winter
The first expansion, Breath of Winter, was released on June 25, 2004, and focused on a new story that takes place after the events of The Order of Dawn. In this expansions, players assume the role of a Runewarrior who is summoned by the leaders of a group of refugees to provide them assistance. However, events soon descend into chaos when the group find themselves working alongside a race of ice-elves to prevent a powerful entity reviving two dark gods that could plunge Eo into darkness. Alongside the new campaign and the enemies it introduces, the expansion brought several improvements to the original gameplay, including new items and spells for use in all game modes.

Shadow of the Phoenix
The second expansion, Shadow of the Phoenix, was released on November 12, 2004, and focused on a story that takes place after the events of Breath of Winter. In this story, players assume the role of a Runewarrior who is summoned to help stop the madness of the necromancer Hokan, who has come back to life thanks to the events in The Order of Dawn. They soon find themselves on a quest to stop Hokan achieving unimaginable power that could make them a god, finding themselves dealing the resurrected souls of the mages of Circle in the process. The expansion features a more difficult campaign aimed for characters who are above level 25 - while players can chose to play as pre-defined avatars, they may also import those created for The Order of Dawn or Breath of Winter, but only if they are above the minimum level requirement for the expansion. In addition to this, the expansion also introduced two new types of units for the playable races, new maps for Freeplay and multiplayer modes, and allows players to choose whether to use the original PvP game rules, or those of Shadow of the Phoenix, though they may not engage players using the other set as a result.

References

External links
Official website

2003 video games
Lua (programming language)-scripted video games
Real-time strategy video games
Role-playing video games
Video games developed in Germany
Video games featuring protagonists of selectable gender
Video games with expansion packs
Windows games
Windows-only games
JoWooD Entertainment games
Aspyr games
Multiplayer and single-player video games